The 2003 Holiday Bowl was a college football bowl game played on December 30 in San Diego, California, part of the 2003 NCAA Division I-A football season. It featured the Washington State Cougars, and the fifth-ranked Texas Longhorns. Washington State pulled off a 28–20 upset, and moved up to ninth in the final rankings.

Scoreless after the first quarter, Texas running back Cedric Benson scored in the second quarter with a 1-yard touchdown run. Washington State tied the game following a 12-yard touchdown pass from quarterback Matt Kegel to wide receiver Sammy Moore. Following a 39-yard field goal, Texas held a 10–7 lead at halftime.

In the third quarter, Washington State outscored Texas by nineteen points. They took their first lead at 13–10 on a 54-yard touchdown pass from Kegel to Moore. Jonathan Smith rushed 12 yards for a touchdown increasing the lead to 20–10, and the Cougars extended their lead to 26–10 lead after Jason David returned a fumble 18 yards for a touchdown.

Early in the fourth quarter, Texas was held to a field goal; WSU led by thirteen, and the Cougars added a safety as Texas was flagged for holding in their own end zone. Chance Mock threw a 30-yard touchdown pass to Roy Williams to pull Texas to within 28–20 with over four minutes remaining, but that was the end  of the scoring.

References

Holiday Bowl
Holiday Bowl
Washington State Cougars football bowl games
Texas Longhorns football bowl games
2003 in sports in California